Laurent Cathala (born 21 September 1945) is the current mayor of Créteil and is a former member of the National Assembly of France.  He represented the Val-de-Marne department,  and is a member of the Socialiste, radical, citoyen et divers gauche.

References

1945 births
Living people
Socialist Party (France) politicians
Deputies of the 12th National Assembly of the French Fifth Republic
Deputies of the 13th National Assembly of the French Fifth Republic
Deputies of the 14th National Assembly of the French Fifth Republic
Mayors of places in Île-de-France
Politicians from Occitania (administrative region)